

Portugal
 Angola – José Rodrigues Coelho do Amaral, Governor-General of Angola (1854–1860)
Portuguese East Africa -

United Kingdom
Bermuda
 Col. Freeman Murray, Governor of Bermuda (1854–1859)
AT. Heniphill, Acting Governor of Bermuda (1859)
William Munroe, Governor of Bermuda (1859–1860)
Province of Canada – Sir Edmund Walker Head, 8th Baronet (1854–1861)
Jamaica – Charles Henry Darling (1857–1863)
Malta Colony – John Le Marchant, Governor of Malta (1858–1864)
India - Charles Canning, 1st Earl Canning, Governor-General of India (1856-1861)New South Wales – Sir William Denison, Governor of New South Wales (1855–1861)
 Queensland Sir George Bowen, Governor of Queensland (1859–1868)
 note:  Queensland was formally separated from New South Wales on 10 December 1859
 Tasmania – Sir Henry Young, Governor of Tasmania (1855–1861)
 South Australia – Sir Richard Graves MacDonnell, Governor of South Australia (1855–1862)
 Victoria – Sir Henry Barkly, Governor of Victoria (1856–1863)
 Western Australia – Sir Arthur Kennedy, Governor of Western Australia (1855–1862)

United StatesNew Mexico Territory – Abraham Rencher, Governor of New Mexico (1857–1861)Utah Territory''' – Alfred Cumming (1858–1861)

Colonial governors
Colonial governors
1859